Comin' Atcha! was a British television series first broadcast on the children's television channel CITV.

In 1998 CITV premiered a one-hour Christmas special featuring the musical group Cleopatra, which went on to become a sitcom series. The show was twenty minutes per episode and followed the girls' lives on tour and at home with their family. The girls' mother and younger sister were featured as themselves. The show ran for two seasons.

Cast

Zainam Higgins - herself
Cleo Higgins - herself
Yonah Higgins - herself
Christine Higgins - herself
Terri Higgins - herself
Matthew Cottle - Lawrence
Ozzie Yue - Mr Lee
Roger Griffiths - Uncle Rudi (series 2)
Simon Schatzberger - Morris (series 2)

References

External links

1998 British television series debuts
2000 British television series endings
ITV children's television shows
Black British sitcoms
British children's comedy television series
Television series by Endemol